Pomatocalpa, commonly known as bladder orchids, or 鹿角兰属 (lu jiao lan shu), is a genus of about twenty five species from the orchid family, Orchidaceae. Plants in this genus are epiphytes or lithophytes with thick, leathery leaves and a large number of small flowers with a three-lobed labellum. There are about twenty five species found from tropical and subtropical Asia to the south-west Pacific.

Description
Orchids in the genus Pomatocalpa are monopodial epiphytic or lithophytic herbs with long, thick roots attached to the substrate, with fibrous stems and long-lasting leaves arranged in two rows with their bases obscuring the stems. A large number of relatively small flowers are arranged on a panicle or raceme and with sepals and petals that are similar to each other and a labellum that has three lobes.

Taxonomy and naming
The genus Pomatocalpa was first formally described in 1829 by Breda in Genera et Species Orchidearum et Asclepiadearum. The type species is Pomatocalpa spicatum. The name Pomatocalpa is derived from the Ancient Greek words pomatos meaning "cover", "lid", "operculum" or "gill-cover" and kalpe meaning "vessel for drawing water", "pitcher" or "urn", referring to the deeply pouched labellum.

Species list:
The following is a list of species accepted by the World Checklist of Selected Plant Families as of December 2018:

 Pomatocalpa angustifolium Seidenf. - Thailand, Vietnam
 Pomatocalpa arachnanthe (Ridl.) J.J.Sm. - Malaysia
 Pomatocalpa armigerum (King & Pantl.) Tang & F.T.Wang - Assam, Bhutan
 Pomatocalpa bambusarum (King & Pantl.) Garay - Assam, Bhutan
 Pomatocalpa bhutanicum N.P.Balakr. - Bhutan
 Pomatocalpa bicolor (Lindl.) J.J.Sm. - Philippines
 Pomatocalpa decipiens (Lindl.) J.J.Sm. - India, Bangladesh, Sri Lanka
 Pomatocalpa diffusum Breda - Thailand, Malaysia, Indonesia, Philippines 
 Pomatocalpa floresanum J.J.Sm. - Flores
 Pomatocalpa fuscum (Lindl.) J.J.Sm. - Malaysia, Borneo, Philippines
 Pomatocalpa grande Seidenf. - Vietnam
 Pomatocalpa incurvum (J.J.Sm.) J.J.Sm. - New Guinea, Solomons
 Pomatocalpa kunstleri (Hook.f.) J.J.Sm. - Thailand, Malaysia, Indonesia, Philippines 
 Pomatocalpa leucanthum (Schltr.) Schltr.  - New Guinea
 Pomatocalpa linearipetalum J.J.Sm. - Seram
 Pomatocalpa macphersonii (F.Muell.) T.E.Hunt - New Guinea, Queensland
 Pomatocalpa maculosum (Lindl.) J.J.Sm. - widespread from Sri Lanka and Bhutan to Java and the Philippines
 Pomatocalpa maculosum subsp. andamanicum (Hook.f.) Watthana
 Pomatocalpa maculosum subsp. maculosum
 Pomatocalpa marsupiale (Kraenzl.) J.J.Sm. - Queensland, Maluku, Sulawesi, New Guinea, Solomons, Vanuatu 
 Pomatocalpa parvum (Ridl.) J.J.Sm. - Pahang
 Pomatocalpa simalurense J.J.Sm . - Simeuluë
 Pomatocalpa sphaetophorum (Schltr.) J.J.Sm. - Borneo
 Pomatocalpa spicatum Breda, Kuhl & Hasselt - Hainan, Assam, Bhutan, Andaman & Nicobar Islands, Indochina, Malaysia, Indonesia, Philippines 
 Pomatocalpa tonkinense (Gagnep.) Seidenf. - Vietnam, Laos
 Pomatocalpa truncatum (J.J.Sm.) J.J.Sm. - Borneo
 Pomatocalpa undulatum (Lindl.) J.J.Sm - Assam, Bangladesh, Taiwan
 Pomatocalpa undulatum subsp. acuminatum (Rolfe) Watthana
 Pomatocalpa undulatum subsp. undulatum

Distribution
Species in the genus Pomatocalpa are found from tropical and substropical Asia to the southwest Pacific.

See also
 List of Orchidaceae genera

References

Vandeae genera
Aeridinae